Lower Clyde River is a community in the Shelburne County, Nova Scotia, Canada.

References

General Service Areas in Nova Scotia
Communities in Shelburne County, Nova Scotia